"Everywhere I Go" is a song by American rap rock band Hollywood Undead. It was released as the fifth single and the third track off their debut studio album Swan Songs.

Composition and lyrics
This song contains explicit lyrics about partying with sexual themes and is one of the band's more party/dance oriented songs. The song was met with mixed reviews, some calling it a fun party track while others criticized its poor lyrics. All of the verses are rapped by member Charlie Scene, whilst the choruses are sung by former member Deuce. Background vocals are performed by Da Kurlzz.

Music video
The music video was released on January 12, 2010 and was directed by member Charlie Scene. The video follows Charlie Scene to a party with the rest of the band doing typical "gangster" acts, dancing with women and general partying.

Chart history

Personnel

Hollywood Undead
Charlie Scene – lead guitar, vocals
Da Kurlzz – backing vocals, drums, percussion
Deuce – bass,  clean vocals, keyboards
J-Dog – keyboards

Additional
Ben Grosse – mixing
Mark Kiczula – engineering
Fox Phelps – assistant programming
B.C. Smith – programming
Don Gillmore - production

Certifications

References

2008 singles
Hollywood Undead songs
2008 songs
Polydor Records singles